Anthracene-9-carbaldehyde is the most common monoaldehyde derivative of anthracene. It is a yellow solid that is soluble in common organic solvents.  It is prepared by Vilsmeier formylation of anthracene.  The compound is also used as a building block for supramolecular assemblies.  Hydrogenation of 9-anthracenecarboxaldehyde gives 9-anthracenemethanol.

References

Aromatic aldehydes
Anthracenes